Philagrius or Philagrios may refer to:

Philagrius (prefect of Egypt), Roman governor of Egypt in 335–337 and 338–340
Philagrius (comes Orientis)
Philagrius of Epirus
Philagrios, a co-editor of Philogelos
Hieromartyr Philagrius of Cyprus, an East Orthodox saint